Osceola Township may refer to:

 Osceola Township, Stark County, Illinois
 Osceola Township, Clarke County, Iowa
 Osceola Township, Franklin County, Iowa
 Osceola Township, Houghton County, Michigan
 Osceola Township, Osceola County, Michigan
 Osceola Township, Renville County, Minnesota
 Osceola Township, Camden County, Missouri
 Osceola Township, St. Clair County, Missouri
 Osceola Township, Tioga County, Pennsylvania
 Osceola Township, Brown County, South Dakota, in Brown County, South Dakota
 Osceola Township, Grant County, South Dakota, in Grant County, South Dakota

See also 
 Oceola Township, Michigan

Township name disambiguation pages